"Hookah" is a song by American rapper Tyga. It was released on April 9, 2014 as the second announced single for The Gold Album: 18th Dynasty, however the single ended up not being on the album. The song, produced by London on da Track, features a guest appearance from fellow American rapper Young Thug. "Hookah" debuted at number 94 on the US Billboard Hot 100 and has peaked at number 85. The song has since been certified Platinum by the RIAA.

Background and release 
On March 15, 2014, Tyga posted a snippet of the song on his Facebook page. Two days later on March 17, the full version of "Hookah" premiered and on April 9, 2014, the song released for digital download.

Music video
The music video was filmed on April 21, 2014, and was directed by Alex Nazari and Tyga. On June 6, 2014, the music video premiered. As of March 31, 2020, the video has over 438 million views.

Remixes 
On May 18, 2014, American rapper K Camp released a remix to "Hookah".

Track listing
 Digital single

Chart performance

Weekly charts

Year-end charts

Certifications

References

External links

2014 singles
2014 songs
Tyga songs
Young Thug songs
Cash Money Records singles
Music videos directed by Colin Tilley
Songs written by Young Thug
Songs written by Tyga
Song recordings produced by London on da Track
Songs written by Jess Jackson (record producer)